William Helms (died 1813) was a United States representative from New Jersey. Born in Sussex County, he served during the Revolutionary War as second lieutenant, first lieutenant, and captain, and was brevetted major on September 30, 1783. Following the War, he was admitted as an original member of The Society of the Cincinnati in the state of New Jersey.

Helms was a member of the New Jersey General Assembly in 1791 and 1792 and was elected as a Democratic-Republican to the Seventh and to the four succeeding Congresses, serving from March 4, 1801 to March 3, 1811. He moved to Hamilton County, Ohio and died in 1813.

References

External links
 The Society of the Cincinnati
 American Revolution Institute

18th-century births
1813 deaths
Politicians from Sussex County, New Jersey
Members of the New Jersey General Assembly
Year of birth unknown
Democratic-Republican Party members of the United States House of Representatives from New Jersey